Cherry Valley Township is located in Winnebago County, Illinois. As of the 2010 census, its population was 19,831 and it contained 8,415 housing units.

Geography

Demographics

History
Leroy M. Green (1882–1941), Illinois state representative, was born in Cherry Valley Township.

References

External links

1849 establishments in Illinois
Populated places established in 1849
Rockford metropolitan area, Illinois
Townships in Illinois
Townships in Winnebago County, Illinois